Lomandra leucocephala is a perennial, rhizomatous herb found in Australia.

References

leucocephala
Asparagales of Australia
Flora of New South Wales
Flora of the Northern Territory
Flora of Queensland
Flora of South Australia
Flora of Victoria (Australia)
Flora of Western Australia